Tom McMillin is a member of the Michigan State Board of Education, and a former member of the Michigan State House from 2009 through 2014, representing the 45th State House district centered in Rochester Hills, Michigan. He was previously mayor of Auburn Hills and a member of the Oakland County Commission. McMillin graduated from the University of Michigan in 1987 with a bachelor's degree in economics and accounting. He is a certified public accountant. McMillian is known as one of the most conservative politician in Michigan, during his 30 year plus career  he defeated a Royal Oak gay rights ordinance and pushed a county commission resolution defining marriage as a union between a man and a woman.

McMillin was the Honorary Chairman of Concerned Taxpayers of Michigan, a ballot question committee opposing a proposal to raise state taxes on the May 5, 2015 ballot.

McMillin was elected Chairman of the 8th Congressional District Republican Committee of Michigan on February 20, 2015.

References

Sources
 State House bio of McMillin
 Republicans take 2 seats on state education board – article in Detroit Free Press

21st-century American politicians
County commissioners in Michigan
Living people
Mayors of places in Michigan
Republican Party members of the Michigan House of Representatives
Michigan Republicans
People from Auburn Hills, Michigan
Tea Party movement activists
University of Michigan alumni
1967 births
Christian nationalists
Paleoconservatism
Discrimination against LGBT people in the United States
Far-right politicians in the United States